Beaucoups of Blues is the second studio album by the English rock musician and former Beatle Ringo Starr. It was released in September 1970, five months after his debut solo album, Sentimental Journey. Beaucoups of Blues is very far removed in style from its pop-based predecessor, relying on country and western influences. A longtime fan of the genre, Starr recorded the album over three days in Nashville with producer Pete Drake and an ensemble of local session players. Beaucoups of Blues failed to chart in Britain but achieved moderate commercial success in the United States, where it reached number 35 on Billboards Country Albums list and number 65 on the Billboard Top LPs chart.

Background
During Ringo Starr's tenure with the Beatles he had dabbled with country music: he sang lead on the band's cover of the country song "Act Naturally", co-wrote the country-influenced track "What Goes On" and wrote the country song "Don't Pass Me By". Before these recordings, Starr's championing of the genre inspired the band's move towards country music on their 1964 album Beatles for Sale. While playing on sessions for George Harrison's All Things Must Pass in May–June 1970, Starr met American pedal steel guitarist Pete Drake, whom Harrison arranged to fly to London to play on some of the tracks. Starr had to pick up Drake from the airport so that the pair could record with Harrison; Drake noticed the number of country albums Starr had in his vehicle. Realising Drake's deep connection to country, Starr asked him if they could collaborate on an album together. Drake told Starr his musician friends could compose more than an album's worth of material in a week, which Starr thought was "impossible". Starr was very keen and agreed. Starr promptly flew to Nashville on 22 June.

Recording
Starr's original idea was to have the sessions take place in England and send the master tapes of the finished tracks to Drake. However, Drake convinced him to have the sessions take place in Nashville instead. All of the tracks were cut in three days, on 25, 26 and 27 June, at Music City Recorders. Sessions were engineered by Scotty Moore. All the material for the album was written purposely for Starr. Guitarist Charlie Daniels recalled the sessions as "pretty typical Nashville sessions. You know, three songs in three hours. It was go in, sit down and work. Here's the songs, here's the chords, let's get it done. It was not a Beatles-type leisurely session. It was work."

Starr sang a duet with Jeannie Kendall on the track "I Wouldn't Have You Any Other Way". Also recorded during the sessions was the B-side to the title track, "Coochy Coochy", which originally ran to 28 minutes in length. The sessions went exceedingly well, according to Starr, who has said that they recorded "a few other tracks that we didn't put out" and ended the sessions with two long jam sessions, one lasting 18 minutes and the other 20 minutes. Session drummer D. J. Fontana recalled that Starr "never varied from that tempo. He had the greatest conception of tempo I've ever heard in my life. I have never heard anybody play that steady in my life, and that's a long time." Acetate discs of the album, which were titled Ringo in Nashville, were sold at an auction in August 1992, featured a different track order and included songs not featured on the released version of the album. It was clear to all that Starr's vocals were much more suited to the genre of country than the old standards that characterised Sentimental Journey. For Starr, making Beaucoups of Blues had fulfilled a lifelong ambition.

Sessions
June 25, 1970 (6PM-9PM): "Woman Of The Night"; "Without Her"
June 25, 1970 (10PM-1AM): "Beaucoups Of Blues"; "Love Don't Last Long"; "Waiting"
June 26, 1970 (6PM-9PM): "I'd Be Talking All The Time"; "$15 Draw"
June 26, 1970 (10PM-1AM): "Wine, Women And Loud Happy Songs"; "The Wishing Book"
June 27, 1970 (6PM-9PM): "Fastest Growing Heartache In The West"; "Silent Homecoming"; "Loser's Lounge"
June 27, 1970 (10PM-1AM): "I Wouldn't Have You Any Other Way"; "Coochy-Coochy"; "Nashville Freakout" (aka "Nashville Jam")

Release
Beaucoups of Blues was released on 25 September 1970 in the UK and on 28 September in the US. The title track was released as a single only in the US, backed with the non-album track "Coochy Coochy" on 5 October 1970. As with Sentimental Journey, the fan base was bemused by Starr's abrupt change in style. Beaucoups of Blues did not perform nearly as well as its predecessor, missing the UK charts and reaching only number 65 in the US. The album fared better in other countries, peaking at number 34 in Canada, number 33 in Australia, and number 21 in Norway.

The front cover of Beaucoups of Blues, according to Sorrells Pickard, was taken outside musician Tracy Nelson's (Mother Earth – The Blues Broads) smokehouse in Nashville by Marshall Fallwell, Jr. The back cover featured a photo of a large majority of the musicians that appeared on the album. In light of the tepid commercial reaction, Starr would refrain from further album releases for the time being, preferring to concentrate on his second vocation, film acting. On 18 October, Apple announced that a second album of the Nashville recordings would be released; however, the album never materialised. Beaucoups of Blues was remastered and reissued on CD in 1995, on 1 May in the UK, and on 1 August in the US. This edition came with two bonus tracks: "Coochy Coochy" and a jam with all the musicians titled "Nashville Jam".

Critical reception

Writing for Rolling Stone, Charles Burton remarked: "If Beaucoups of Blues reminds one of any record, it's Nashville Skyline, only instead of being lovable, spaced-out Bobby Dylan in front of those luxurious Nashville backups, it's lovable Richard Starkey who is crooning his heart out." In an interview with Jann Wenner of Rolling Stone on 8 December 1970, John Lennon called the album "a good record", but qualified that comment by saying he "didn't feel as embarrassed as I did about [Starr's] first record".

In Melody Maker, Richard Williams remarked on Starr's limitations as a vocalist but found that his "conviction and charm" were such that Beaucoups of Blues "forces one to abdicate from any hip posture and admit, just this once, to sheer uncomplicated enjoyment". Williams acknowledged the key roles played by Drake and guitarist Chuck Howard, before concluding: "One can imagine … that Ringo had a ball making this album. I had a ball listening to it." In his combined review of all the former Beatles' 1970 solo releases, Geoffrey Cannon of The Guardian rated Beaucoups of Blues as his favourite, saying: "The result is superb. Not because Ringo is a good singer, but because, this time, he's let himself be used well. People who work with men like Pete Drake and Charlie McCoy don't go wrong." Writing in Saturday Review magazine, Ellen Sander described the LP as "so protective and perfect a presentation of a vastly underestimated singing talent" and paired it with Harrison's All Things Must Pass as solo albums that "delight in their individuality while recognizing, but not relying on, a former mode of expression". Village Voice critic Robert Christgau believed Starr was trying to impersonate Buck Owens while singing flat, if not entirely faint, but concluded that "both the songs and Pete Drake's production bespeak a high-quality obsession – the music sticks. And Ringo is still Ringo, which means he's good at making himself felt."

Although it was only moderately successful at the time, some critics have since stated that Beaucoups of Blues is one of Starr's best albums. Bob Woffinden wrote in his 1981 book The Beatles Apart: "Ringo took his chance well and his homely lugubrious voice suited those typically maudlin country songs like a charm. It's one of the best Beatle solo albums." Among reviews of the 1995 reissue, Q magazine described it as "always likable and original" and "a collection of contemporary country songs, delivered by Ringo Starr in a languidly melancholic style curiously reminiscent of Michael Nesmith". Mojo editor Paul Du Noyer admired the "stellar cast of country players" on the recordings and added that "the groove is loose and fluent."

Track listing

Personnel
Ringo Starr – vocals, acoustic guitar
Chuck Howard – guitar
Charlie Daniels – guitar
Jerry Kennedy – guitar
Dave Kirby – guitar
Sorrells Pickard – guitar
Jerry Reed – guitar
Jerry Shook – guitar
Ben Keith – pedal steel guitar
Pete Drake – pedal steel guitar
Roy Huskey – upright bass
Buddy Harman – drums
D.J. Fontana – drums
Jim Buchanan – fiddle
George Richey – fiddle
Grover Lavender – fiddle
Charlie McCoy – harmonica
The Jordanaires – backing vocals
Jeannie Kendall – backing vocals on "I Wouldn't Have You Any Other Way"

Charts

References
 Footnotes

 Citations

External links

JPGR's Beaucoups of Blues site

1970 albums
Ringo Starr albums
Apple Records albums
EMI Records albums
Country albums by English artists
Albums produced by Pete Drake